The 2023 Nigerian presidential election in Enugu State was held on 25 February 2023 as part of the nationwide 2023 Nigerian presidential election to elect the president and vice president of Nigeria. Other federal elections, including elections to the House of Representatives and the Senate, will also be held on the same date while state elections will be held two weeks afterward on 11 March.

Background
Enugu State is a small, Igbo-majority southeastern state with a growing economy and natural resources but facing an underdeveloped agricultural sector, rising debt, and a low COVID-19 vaccination rate. Politically, the state's 2019 elections were categorized as a continuation of the PDP's control as Ugwuanyi won with over 95% of the vote and the party won every seat in the House of Assembly along with all three senate seats and all eight House of Representatives seats. On the presidential level, the state was easily won by PDP presidential nominee Atiku Abubakar but it did swung towards Buhari compared to 2015 and had lower turnout.

Polling

Projections

General election

Results

By senatorial district 
The results of the election by senatorial district.

By federal constituency
The results of the election by federal constituency.

By local government area 
The results of the election by local government area.

See also 
 2023 Enugu State elections
 2023 Nigerian presidential election

Notes

References 

Enugu State gubernatorial election
2023 Enugu State elections
Enugu